Alfredo Battisi (17 January 1925 – 1 January 2012) was the Catholic archbishop of the Archdiocese of Udine, Italy.

Ordained to the priesthood in 1947, Battisi became archbishop in 1972 and retired in 2000.

Notes

Roman Catholic archbishops in Italy
Bishops in Friuli-Venezia Giulia
1925 births
2012 deaths
Italian Roman Catholic archbishops